WTSK (790 AM, "Praise 93.3") is a radio station serving the Tuscaloosa, Alabama, area with a Gospel music format. It is under ownership of Townsquare Media.

In February 2005, Apex Broadcasting Inc. (Houston L. Pearce, chairman) reached an agreement to sell WTSK and six other radio stations in Alabama to Citadel Broadcasting (Farid Suleman, chairman/CEO) for a reported sale price of $29 million. Citadel merged with Cumulus Media on September 16, 2011. Cumulus sold the station, along with its sister stations, to Townsquare Media effective July 31, 2012.

WTSK provides regular weather coverage from ABC 33/40 Chief Meteorologist James Spann. During times of active severe, tropical, and Winter weather events, WTSK provides West, Alabama's only live and local weather coverage on the radio, with local, in house, Staff Meteorologist Bobby Best.

Additionally, under the ownership of Townsquare Media and the direction of Market President/Chief Revenue Officer David R. Dubose, WTSK also provides West, Alabama radio's only live and local news coverage with News Director Don Hartley and West, Alabama's only live and local traffic coverage with Traffic Reporter Capt'n Ray.

Previous logo
  (WTSK's logo under previous "Truth" branding)

Translator

References

External links

Gospel radio stations in the United States
Radio stations established in 1958
1958 establishments in Alabama
Townsquare Media radio stations
TSK